The Wattenbach or Wattenerbach is a river of Tyrol, Austria, a tributary of the Inn.

The Wattenbach has its origin in the Tux Prealps. The rivers Mölsbach and Lizumbach merge in the valley bottom near  at a height of  thus forming the origin of the Wattenbach. It then flows from the Wattentaler Lizum almost due north through the Wattental valley. After  it empties near Wattens into the Inn.

Water quality
Until the river reaches Wattens the water has grade A quality. The small village Wattenberg diverts their wastewater into the sewage works of Fritzens.
Although the water is cleaned through several sewage treatment plants the Inn suffers from the polluted water. Only the heavy metal pollution could be reduced strongly. Several constructed defence structures have also successfully been avoiding high water.

Usage
Nine power plants use the water furthermore intensively and the water also is used by industry facilities. Therefore, sometimes very little water runs and the brook is threatened by desiccation.

References

Rivers of Tyrol (state)
Rivers of Austria